Marcos Benjamín Melgarejo Martínez (born 3 October 1986) is a Paraguayan international footballer who plays for Deportivo Capiatá as a midfielder.

Career
Born in Asunción, Melgarejo has played football for Nacional and Libertad.

He made his international debut for Paraguay in 2009.

References

External links

1986 births
Living people
Paraguayan footballers
Paraguay international footballers
Paraguayan Primera División players
Categoría Primera A players
Club Nacional footballers
Club Libertad footballers
Deportes Tolima footballers
Club Sol de América footballers
Paraguayan expatriate footballers
Expatriate footballers in Colombia
Association football midfielders